Audun Munthe-Kaas Hierman (8 September 1892 – 27 February 1975) was a Norwegian newspaper editor and novelist.

He was born in Flora. He was the editor-in-chief of Smaalenenes Amtstidende from 1919 to 1931, then Sarpen, Larvik Morgenavis and finally Tønsbergs Blad from 1950 to 1954. He published several novels; some for a juvenile audience under the pseudonym Peder Flint.

References

1892 births
1975 deaths
Norwegian newspaper editors
20th-century Norwegian novelists